Fritz Wetzel (12 December 1894 – 19 January 1982) was a German international footballer.

References

1894 births
1982 deaths
Association football midfielders
German footballers
Germany international footballers
1. FC Pforzheim players